"Şımarık" ("Spoilt"), also known as "Kiss Kiss", is a 1997 song by Turkish singer Tarkan. It was written by Sezen Aksu, with music credited as composed by Tarkan. However, Tarkan later admitted in a 2006 interview that this had been done without Aksu's consent, who was the true copyright owner. It formed part of Tarkan's third album, Ölürüm Sana (1997). "Şımarık" was released in France in 1998 and the rest of the world in 1999, from the compilation album Tarkan, which was released in Europe. It has sold two million copies all across Europe. 

Many versions of the song were recorded in different languages, most notably the English-language cover, titled "Kiss Kiss", by Greek-American singer Stella Soleil in 2001, which was itself covered by Australian actress Holly Valance in 2002.

The song
As Tarkan's first major single, the song is generally considered his debut single. He had released three albums before this, but never released a song in single format due to the album-orientated nature of the Turkish music industry. The song has also appeared in soundtracks of various movies, including French film Beau travail and the American film XX/XY. It is generally considered Tarkan's signature song in Europe. Its chorus ends with two characteristic kiss sounds.

Music video
The accompanying music video for "Şımarık" is directed by Emmanuel Saada and shot in Marseille, France, in a neighborhood called "Le panier", with narrow streets and cobbled roads. Here, Tarkan sings and jaywalks. Several women on the streets sees him and starts chasing him to try to kiss him, but he tries to avoid them by first changing direction and then later by walking faster. More and more women begin to chase him as the song proceeds, but Tarkan eventually starts running in order to avoid them. A big group of women then run after him and as the song finishes, Tarkan takes cover in a street corner. A young girl is there as well and Tarkan kisses her forehead. The video was the first that Saada directed.

Track listings

 Şımarık, 1999
 Şımarık Malagutti (4:46)
 Şımarık Malagutti edit remix (3:17)
 Şımarık Malagutti extended remix (7:00)
 Şımarık Ned Divine edit remix (3:13)
 Şımarık Ned Divine extended remix (5:56)
 Şımarık radio edit(3:12)
 Şımarık long (original) version (3:55)
 Şımarık Orıental (4:05)
 Şımarık Zıo dub extended remix (6:11)
 Şımarık Zıo dub edit remix
 Şımarık Şınan soulful (6:14)
 Şımarık Şınan dub
Track lists to this CD single change depending on the country of release, e.g. America and Germany.

There were four promotional LP versions released.
A promotional CD single was released in France, with an orange cover. This was the first ever release and included one track. This is now a collector's item. There was also a limited edition (fan-edition) single released in Germany, which came with a poster of Tarkan.

Commercial performance
When the single was released in Europe, it reached No. 1 in Belgium, No. 2 in Norway, plus No. 3 in Switzerland, France, Germany and the Netherlands. Sales went gold in Europe, where Tarkan was presented with his gold disc at Cannes Midem and in Germany by Universal.

Charts

Weekly charts

Year-end charts

Certifications

Usage in media
"Şımarık" was featured in films and soap opera including Beau travail, Romané  and XX/XY.

"Şımarık" and sound effects of Tarkan's kiss sounds was used in several Chilean television programs, including: Calle 7, Yingo, En portada, Buenos Días a Todos, Muy buenos días, Mucho gusto, Gente como tú, La mañana de Chilevisión, and others.

"Şımarık" was used as the intro music for the Norwegian TV series about multi-cultural Norway, Migrapolis.

It was also used as the intro music for an Israeli TV current affairs news show named London et Kirschenbaum. In the United Kingdom, Channel 4 used the song in trailers for Graham Norton's chat show So Graham Norton in 2001.

Stella Soleil version

"Kiss Kiss" is the debut single by American recording artist Stella Soleil. It is a remake of "Şımarık" with new lyrics. The English version was credited to by Juliette Jaimes, Sezen Aksu, Tarkan, and Steve Welton-Jaimes. The single was released to American radio on 19 and 20 March 2001. It was also released in regions of Europe, excluding the UK.

Music video
The music video is set on the beach during the late night. The video (directed by Hype Williams) shows Soleil dancing on the sand, while scenes go back and forth from birds eye views of landscape around the beach.

Track listing
 US promotional single
 "Kiss Kiss" (radio version)

 US 12-inch promotional single
A1. "Kiss Kiss" (main version) – 3:05
A2. "Kiss Kiss" (instrumental) – 3:04
B1. "Kiss Kiss" (main version) – 3:05
B2. "Kiss Kiss" (acappella) – 2:45

Charts

Holly Valance version

Australian actress Holly Valance covered "Kiss Kiss" and released it as her debut single on 29 April 2002. Her version topped the charts of both Australia and the United Kingdom.

Commercial performance
The single debuted at number one in the United Kingdom on 5 May 2002, selling 143,408 copies in its first week. The song made its debut on the Australian ARIA Singles Chart and UK Singles Chart at number one. It went on to spend nine weeks in the ARIA top 10, 13 weeks in the top 20, and seventeen weeks in the top 50. In Finland, Hungary, Ireland, and Italy, the song peaked within the top 10. It also reached the top 20 in Austria, Denmark, Germany, Greece, Sweden, New Zealand, and Switzerland. It was certified platinum by the Australian Recording Industry Association (ARIA) and gold by the British Phonographic Industry (BPI).

Music video
The official music video for Valance's version features a compilation of Valance herself with a variety of different looks and sexualised outfits whilst performing the song. The video opens with a close-up of Valance's lips, painted with a burnished red gloss, as she mimes a kiss at the viewer. Lightbulbs flash and pulse on a black background, gradually illuminating Valance's apparently-naked figure, save for two bars of light across her chest and hips. Valance is next shown within a second black room, this time surrounded by blue rectangular strips of light. During the video, these lights change to red before returning to their original color.

As Valance begins to sing, the view returns to the opening close-up scene, before cutting to show her sat within and surrounded by a black velvet structure. The room is illuminated further by a mosaic background pattern of flashing white lights. Between shots, two DJ's are seen using a record table. During the chorus, the scene shifts to show Valance with six male backing dancers on a black and gold backdrop. The video switches between each of these settings throughout the video.

Awards and nominations
"Kiss Kiss" was nominated for four ARIA Awards at the 16th ARIA Awards in 2002.

Track listings
 Australian CD single
 "Kiss Kiss" (Wise Buddha mix) – 3:23
 "Kiss Kiss" (Jah Wobble remix) – 5:15
 "Kiss Kiss" (Agent Sumo 2) – 7:41
 "Kiss Kiss" (Stargate R&B mix) – 3:02

 UK CD single
 "Kiss Kiss" (Wise Buddha mix) – 3:25
 "Kiss Kiss" (Jah Wobble remix) – 5:15
 "Kiss Kiss" (Agent Sumo 2) – 7:41
 "Kiss Kiss" (Stargate R&B mix) – 3:02
 "Kiss Kiss" (video)

 UK cassette single and European CD single
 "Kiss Kiss" (Wise Buddha mix) – 3:25
 "Kiss Kiss" (Stargate R&B mix) – 3:02

Charts

Weekly charts

Year-end charts

Certifications

Release history

Other cover versions

Aside from "Kiss Kiss", there were many other covers of "Şımarık" in English and various languages, like a version sung by Hong Kong group E02 in Cantonese and an Egyptian cover version sung by Samy Mansour. Notable covers include:
 In 1998 Russian singer Filipp Kirkorov re-released "Şımarık" in Russian as Поцелуй (Kiss) from the album Ой, Мама, Шика Дам.
 In 1999, Ukrainian singer Viktor Pavlik (Ukrainian Віктор Павлік) re-released "Şımarık" in Ukrainian as "Rozbeshchenyy" (Ukrainian Розбещений) from the album "Aphiny, Kyiv, Istanbul", ukr. Афіни-Київ-Істанбул".
 In 2001, Spanish-Moroccan singer Hakim released La Muchacha Turca in Spanish as part of his album Entre dos orillas, but created his own lyrics, in Spain.
 In 2006, South Korean singer Mina covered "Kiss Kiss".
 8 feleséggel sok a baj / There are so many problems with 8 wives / (in Hungarian by Irigy Hónaljmirigy)
 La Muchacha Turca / Turkish Girl / (in Spanish, by Paco Ortega/Hakim, 2001)
 La Muchacha Guapa / Pretty Girl / (in Spanish by La Banda Pachuco, 2002)
 Ein Kuss / A Kiss / (in German by Die Schlümpfe, 1999)
 Žene Vole Dijamante / Women Love Diamonds / (in Serbian by Jelena Karleuša, 1998)
 Ekstaza / Ecstasy / (in Serbian by Dado Polumenta, 2005)
 El Bawsi (in Arabic by Rida and Nina Boutros, 1999)
 Booseh Faransavi (in Persian by Mehran
 Yeki Na Doutaa (in Persian by Sharareh, 2000)
 Filakia (in Greek by Lefteris Pantazis, 2000)
 Neshika / Kiss / (in Hebrew by Rinat Bar, 1998)
 CHU!CHU!は恋の合言葉 (in Japanese by Kentarō Hayami, 2000)
 Bos (in Dari by Showwkat)
 Kiss Kiss (in English by Bodyjar, 2002)
 Kiss Kiss (in Cantonese by EO2 and Tiffany Lee, 2002)
 Kiss (Kita Sayang Sayang) (in Indonesian by Lilis Karlina, 2001)
 Chiki Chiki Bam Bam (in Telugu language India by Tippu in Aadi, 2002)
 Beijo na Boca / Kiss in the Mouth / (in Portuguese by Mr. Jam)
 Dá-me Um Xoxo / Give me a Kiss / (in Portuguese by Tayti)
 Selinho na Boca (in Portuguese by Latino and Perlla, 2008)
 Искаш ли близалка? / Do you want a lollipop? / (in Bulgarian by Ruslan Mainov, 1999)
 Дай ми целувка / Give me a kiss / (in Bulgarian by Tonita, 1999)
 Хищница / Predator / (in Bulgarian by Extra Nina, 1999)
 Pusz-pussz (in Hungarian by Pa-Dö-Dő, 2003)
 Kiss-Kiss / TCM-istele / (in Romanian by Vacanța Mare in Cu oltenii la eclipsă show.)
 Poljubi me / Kiss Me / (in Slovenian by Sandi Selimčič)
 Të Më Japësh Një Puthje (in Albanian by Shkëlqim Kola)

Samplings and adaptations

Dj R'AN version

 In 2016, French Dj R'AN (also known as Lucenzo Dj) released an adapted version of the song with new lyrics and added music. The single also titled "Kiss Kiss" and featured vocals by Swedish Mohombi and American Big Ali with additional work by Willy William. A music video was also released.

An alternative release of the DJ R'AN version of "Kiss Kiss" was done in 2017 by Kosovar-German singer Ardian Bujupi with Dj R'AN featuring Mohombi and Big Ali.

Other samplings
 Yosi Piamenta released a version quoting Kol Hamesameach, a Hebrew language passage from the Talmud, but set to the melody of the song "Şımarık".
 An Israeli 6PM news program on Channel 10 named London et Kirschenbaum (named after the hosts, Yaron London and the program's late host Moti Kirschenbaum) is using a sample of this song in its opening theme.

References

External links
 Single and Song Lyrics Information in English
 Beau Travail at IMDB
 XX/XY at IMDB

Tarkan (singer) songs
Holly Valance songs
1997 songs
1999 singles
2001 singles
2002 debut singles
Songs about kissing
English-language Turkish songs
Music videos directed by Hype Williams
Music videos directed by Tim Royes
Number-one singles in Australia
Number-one singles in Scotland
Songs written by Tarkan (singer)
Turkish-language songs
UK Singles Chart number-one singles
Ultratop 50 Singles (Wallonia) number-one singles